Ganzhuang Subdistrict is a subdistrict in Yuanjiang Hani, Yi and Dai Autonomous County, Yunnan, China.

Administrative division
As of 2016, the subdistrict is divided into four communities and nine villages: 
 Hongxin Community
 Ganzhuang Community
 Ganba Community
 Qinglongchang Community
 Take
 Guoluozhi
 Tongchangchong
 Cuoke
 Abudu
 Jiamodai
 Pengcheng
 Lutong
 Xilahe

Geography

Economy
The subdistrict's economy is based on nearby mineral resources and agricultural resources. Tobacco, sugarcane, and fruit are commercial crops in the region. The region abounds with copper and iron.

Transportation
The National Highway G213 passes across the subdistrict.

References

Bibliography

Divisions of Yuanjiang Hani, Yi and Dai Autonomous County